Hans Julius Eggeling (1842–1918) was Professor of Sanskrit at the University of Edinburgh from 1875 to 1914, second holder of its Regius Chair of Sanskrit, and Secretary of the Royal Asiatic Society, London.

Eggeling was translator and editor of the Satapatha Brahmana in 5 volumes of the monumental Sacred Books of the East series edited by Max Müller, author of the main article on Sanskrit in the Encyclopædia Britannica, and curator of the University Library from 1900 to 1913. In August 1914 he left for a vacation in his native Germany, but because of World War I, he was unable to return before his death in 1918.

He lived on Brunstane Road in Joppa, Edinburgh.

References

External links

1842 births
1918 deaths
British Indologists
Academics of the University of Edinburgh
German emigrants to Scotland